Roadmaster may refer to:

Roadmaster (loudspeaker) a brand of loudspeaker in Indonesia
Buick Roadmaster, an automobile produced by Buick 1936–1958 and 1991–1996
Roadmaster (bicycles) a brand of Pacific Cycle
Roadmaster (album), a 1973 album and title track by Gene Clark
Roadmaster (rail), a type of railroad maintenance official
Roadmaster (band), in which Toby Myers and Steve Riley played

See also 
 AEC Routemaster, a double decker bus